Megachile chelostomoides is a species of bee in the family Megachilidae. It was described by Gribodo in 1894.

References

Chelostomoides
Insects described in 1894